Agathotoma phryne is a species of sea snail, a marine gastropod mollusk in the family Mangeliidae.

Description
The length of the shell attains 6.2 mm, its diameter 2.5 mm.

(Original description) The small, fusiform, short, stout shell is whitish, with three obscure pale brownish spiral bands on the body whorl. The protoconch is minute, translucent, and contains about one whorl with somewhat over four subsequent whorls in the teleoconch The suture is appressed and obscure. The spiral sculpture consists of numerous very fine equal close-set threads over the whole surface. The axial sculpture consists of seven strong rounded somewhat sigmoid ribs, slightly shouldered near the suture, continuous up the spire and obliquely retract ive posteriorly. There are no obvious incremental lines. The ribs extend from the siphonal canal to the suture on the body whorl. The aperture is narrow,. The anal sulcus is shallow and rounded. The outer lip is broadly infolded, smooth within. The  inner lip is smooth, not callous. The siphonal canal is hardly differentiated.

Distribution
This marine species occurs in the Pacific Ocean off Panama.

References

External links
  Bouchet P., Kantor Yu.I., Sysoev A. & Puillandre N. (2011) A new operational classification of the Conoidea. Journal of Molluscan Studies 77: 273-308. 
  Tucker, J.K. 2004 Catalog of recent and fossil turrids (Mollusca: Gastropoda). Zootaxa 682:1-1295.

phryne
Gastropods described in 1919